The Dalles Formation is a geologic formation in Oregon. It preserves fossils dating back to the Neogene period.

See also 
 List of fossiliferous stratigraphic units in Oregon
 Paleontology in Oregon

References 

Neogene geology of Oregon
Formations